This is a list of Italian films first released in 2015 (see 2015 in film).

See also
2015 in Italy
2015 in Italian television

External links
Italian films of 2015 at the Internet Movie Database

2015
Films
Italian